Rübezahl is a folkloric mountain spirit (woodwose) of the Giant Mountains (Krkonoše, Riesengebirge, Karkonosze), a mountain range along the border between the historical lands of Bohemia and Silesia. He is the subject of many legends and fairy tales in German, Polish, and Czech folklore.

Name

The origin of the name is not clear. One interpretation is from the story How Rübezahl Got his Name by Johann Karl August Musäus, which recounts how Rübezahl abducted a princess who liked turnips (singular Rübe). The princess gets very lonely there in the mountains. To keep her company, Rübezahl turns the turnips into her friends and acquaintances. As the turnips wilt after a little while, so do the persons that were created by Rübezahl's magic. The princess asks him to count (zählen) the turnips in the field. While he counted, she escaped. Following this explanation, some early English writers translated his name as "Number Nip" (that is, "turnip numberer"), including the 1911 Encyclopædia Britannica.

Another proposed etymology is Riebezagel, from a combination of the personal name Riebe and the Middle High German zagel, meaning "tail", from his pictorial representation as a tailed demon. According to the etymologist Friedrich Kluge, the name is a contraction of Middle High German Ruobezagel, ‘turnip-tail’.

Rübezahl is a name of ridicule, the use of which provokes his anger. Respectful names are "Lord of the Mountain(s)" (Herr vom Berge, Herr der Berge), "Treasure Keeper" (Schatzhüter) or among herbalists "Lord John" (Herr Johannes, Latin vocative: Domine Johannes). In one Silesian folktale, he is called "Prince of the Gnomes" (Fürst der Gnomen).

The Polish name Liczyrzepa is a direct translation of the German name, introduced by Stanisław Bełza in 1898. It only became widespread in Poland after 1945 when Józef Sykulski started to translate tales of Rübezahl from German into Polish.
The Czech name, Krakonoš, is simply derived from the name of the mountains.

Legends 

In legends, Rübezahl appears as a capricious giant, gnome, or mountain spirit. With good people he is friendly, teaching them medicine and giving them presents. If someone derides him, however, he exacts a severe revenge. He sometimes plays the role of a trickster in folk tales.

The stories originate from pagan times. Rübezahl is the fantastic lord of weather of the mountains and is similar to the Wild Hunt. Unexpectedly or playfully, he sends lightning and thunder, fog, rain and snow from the mountain above, even while the sun is shining. He may take the appearance of a monk in a gray frock (like Wotan); he holds a stringed instrument in his hand (the storm harp) and walks so heavily that the earth trembles around him.

In Czech fairytales, Rübezahl gave sourdough to people and invented the traditional regional soup kyselo. There is also a mountain named Kotel, which means cauldron. When fog rises from the valley at the bottom of the Kotel, people say that Rübezahl is cooking kyselo. Rübezahl is seen to be the guardian of the Krkonoše Mountains. Physically, his appearance varies; he can take any form he wishes, from an old grandma to a giant crossing his mountains with one step. Historically, his character has kept on expanding; from a bad demon causing storms and heavy snow, he evolved into a guardian of the poor people living in his mountains. It is said that he could test someone at any time to know whether that person's heart is pure (e.g. meeting someone as an old lady asking for help) and that if one does, that person would be shown the way to treasures hidden deep inside his mountains. He punished the German landlords mistreating Czech people as well as any invaders.

Museum
Museum devoted to the figure of Rübezahl in the German town of Görlitz, the Rübezahl Museum, was opened in May 2005, thanks to the work of Ingrid Vettin-Zahn. Originally from Lauban (Lubań) in Lower Silesia, Vettin-Zahn was expelled from her hometown like other Silesian Germans and subsequently resettled in Switzerland after 1945.

Appearances in literature

Rübezahl was first mentioned in 1565 as Ribicinia in a poem by Franz von Koeckritz. The Rübezahl story was first collected and written down by Johannes Praetorius in the Daemonologia Rubinzalii Silesii (1662). The character later appeared Johann Karl August Musäus's Legenden von Rübezahl (1783) and Carl Hauptmann's Rübezahl-Buch as well as Otfried Preußler's Mein Rübezahl-Buch. Finally, there is Ferdinand Freiligrath's Aus dem schlesischen Gebirge from Ein Glaubensbekenntnis, 1844 and Robert Reinick's Rübezahls Mittagstisch. He is potentially inspiration for the character Huhn in Gerhart Hauptmann's "Und Pippa Tanzt!".

The poem "Count Carrots" by Gerda Mayer is based on the tale and appears in The Oxford Book of Story Poems.

Rübezahl's Garden
Near Mount Sněžka in the Czech Republic close to the Polish border, there is a botanical locality with an especially large variety of plants that bears the name "Rübezahl's Garden". Some unusual stone buildings in the area are named after him as well, for example the Rübezahlkanzel an den Schneegruben.

In the vicinity of Jelenia Góra and other Polish locales under the  Krkonose Mountains, there is an annual series of opera performances titled Muzyczny Ogród Liczyrzepy, which translates into English as "Rübezahl's Musical Garden. In 2016, the series commenced for the 13th time.

In music

Joseph Schuster: opera Rübenzahl, ossia Il vero amore (1789 Trieste)
Vincenc Tuček: singspiel Rübezahl (1801 Breslau)
Carl Maria von Weber: romantic opera Rübezahl (1805 Breslau)
Franz Danzi: romantic opera Der Berggeist oder Schicksal und Treue (1813 Karlsruhe)
Wilhelm Würfel: opera Rübezahl (1824 Prague)
Louis Spohr: opera Der Berggeist (1825 Kassel)
August Conradi: comic opera Rübezahl (1849 Berlín)
Francis Edward Bache: operetta Rubezahl (1853)
Friedrich von Flotow: opera Rübezahl (1852 Retzin, Groß Pankow)
Gustav Mahler: opera Rübezahl (1879–83), music lost but libretto preserved
Arthur H. Bird: ballet Rübezahl (1887)
Josef Richard Rozkošný: opera Krakonoš (1889 Prague)
Hans Sommer: opera Rübezahl und der Sackpfeifer von Neiße (1904 Braunschweig)
Erich Wolfgang Korngold: movement No. 3 of Märchenbilder Op. 3 (1911 Carlsbad)
Willy Czernik: symphonic poem Rübezahl (1940)
Amon Düül II: instrumental psychedelic rock track The Return of Rübezahl on the LP Yeti (album) (1970)
Jan Klusák: opera pasticcio Bertram a Mescalinda aneb Potrestaná věrnost též Očarované housle Einsteinovy čili Krakonošův dar (2002 Praha)
Dschinghis Khan: song Rübezahl from LP Helden, Schurken & der Dudelmoser (1982)

In film 
Rübezahl's Wedding (1916)
 Rübezahl (1957)
 The Rübezahl Series (1975-1983, Krátký film Praha Studio Jirího Trnky, Czechoslovakia & DEFA, GDR, filmed in Dresden)
 Rübezahls Schatz (2017), German/Czech fairytale movie filmed in Bohemian Switzerland

Krakonoš

The Czech variant of Rübezahl, Krakonoš, features in literature and in other culture:

 Krakonoš played an important role in old local legends in Krkonoše, which have been collected since 1618. To the present day Krakonoš features as the principal character in many regional folk-tales.
 Krakonoš appeared as a main character in the Czech children's television series Krkonošské pohádky broadcast in the program Večerníček.
 A brewery located in Trutnov makes "Krakonoš" beer.

Further reading
 Henning Eichberg: Rübezahl. Historischer Gestaltwandel und schamanische Aktualität. In: Jahrbuch der Schlesischen Friedrich-Wilhelms-Universität zu Breslau, Sigmaringen, 1991; 32: 153-178.
 Stephan Kaiser: Der Herr der Berge Rübezahl. Katalog zur Ausstellung. Königswinter-Heisterbacherrott: Museum für schlesische Landeskunde, 2000 (Hrsg.)

Notes

External links
 Musäus: Rübezahl und das Hirschberger Schneiderlein, illustrated by Arpad Schmidhammer, Fischer & Franke, Berlin 1901 
 Carl Hauptmann: Rübezahl-Buch on Projekt Gutenberg-DE 
 Rübezahl and music 
 Rübezahl – Sage und Wirklichkeit 
 muellers-lesezeit.de
 Rübezahl - Duch Gór - Rybecal by Ullrich Junker & Izabela Taraszczuk, Bodnegg - Jelenia Góra 2003 on Digital Library of Jelenia Góra 
 Greiffenberg Notgeld (emergency banknotes) Small currency notes from the town of Greiffenberg depicting the legend of Rübezahl      webgerman.com/Notgeld/ 

Czech folklore
Earth spirits
German legendary creatures
Giants
Gnomes
Medieval legends
Polish folklore
Slavic legendary creatures
Sudetes